The Centennial Station (also known as Olympia–Lacey) is a train station located immediately south of Lacey, Washington, United States that also serves the capital city of Olympia. The station is served by Amtrak's (the National Railroad Passenger Corporation) Cascades and Coast Starlight.

Local transit connections are provided by Intercity Transit.  Bus routes 64 and 94 connect to Lacey and Olympia Transit Centers.

History

The original Union Pacific East Olympia station in East Olympia was demolished in the late 1960s. It was used by the pool trains that ran between Seattle and Portland by all three railroads that used the line, Northern Pacific, Great Northern, and Union Pacific. Amtrak trains during the 1970s and 1980s used a wooden shelter as East Olympia's passenger train station. However, the station site was remote and had no public transport, no lighting and a pot-holed gravel parking lot with a public telephone that rarely worked.

A new Amtrak station to replace East Olympia was proposed in the late 1980s, to be located on county-owned land facing the Yelm Highway. Centennial Station opened on October 28, 1990, with temporary lighting for the  platform and portable toilets, as well as a 36-space parking lot. The first phase of the project—installing permanent lighting and landscaping—was completed in December at a cost of $385,000. A 60 percent increase in ridership was reported for that month, with over 2,000 passengers using Centennial Station compared to 1,302 in December 1989 at the former East Olympia stop.

The station's depot was built by the non-profit Amtrak Depot Committee, which began raising funds in 1987 and aimed to open a permanent station in time for the state centennial in 1989. The committee raised $500,000 through government grants, business contributions, individual donations, and the sale of engraved bricks that were later laid in the station plaza. Centennial Station's depot and waiting area opened to the public on May 1, 1993, following the delayed installation of a sewer system.

It is believed to be the only Amtrak station in the nation  and operated entirely by volunteers. The train station was sold to Intercity Transit for $1 in September 1993, while the Amtrak Depot Committee remained the main operators of the facility. The committee also raised $10,000 to install a  clocktower in the courtyard, which was dedicated on November 14, 1994, as part of a ceremony for the Talgo trainsets entering service on the Seattle–Portland corridor. Despite early proposals to bypass the Olympia area in favor of a shorter route via Roy, Amtrak's rebranded Cascades service with Talgo trainsets debuted at the station in 1999. The station's parking lot was expanded to 133 stalls as part of an improvement project that was completed in 2001. A second improvement project, completed in 2003, included a rebuilt train platform for accessibility and the installation of an electronic information kiosk.

References

External links

Amtrak stations in Washington (state)
Bus stations in Washington (state)
Railway stations in the United States opened in 1990
Transportation buildings and structures in Thurston County, Washington
Lacey, Washington
1990 establishments in Washington (state)